Lawrence Murray may refer to:

 Lawrence O. Murray, United States Comptroller of the Currency, 1908–1913
 Lawrence J. Murray, Jr. (1910–2000), American lawyer and politician from New York